Kahuta Tehsil is one of the seven tehsils (subdivisions) of Rawalpindi District in the Punjab province of Pakistan. The neighbouring tehsil of Kallar Sayedan used to be part of Kahuta, but was later created as separate tehsil. The name Kahuta was derived from "Koh" a local medicinal tree (Look the leaves as Oliven) and "Boota". Perhaps "Koh Boota" was shortened to Kohuta/Kahuta over the passage of time.

History
In 997 CE, Sultan Mahmud Ghaznavi, took over the Ghaznavid dynasty empire established by his father, Sultan Sebuktegin, In 1005 he conquered the Shahis in Kabul in 1005, and followed it by the conquests of Punjab region. The Delhi Sultanate and later Mughal Empire ruled the region. The Punjab region became predominantly Muslim due to missionary Sufi saints whose dargahs dot the landscape of Punjab region.

After the decline of the Mughal Empire, the Sikh Empire invaded and occupied Rawalpindi District. The local Muslims faced restrictions and oppression during the Sikh rule in the area. The area was then conquered by the British in the Second Anglo-Sikh War. During the period of British rule, Kahuta Tehsil increased in population and importance.

In the 18th century, Kahuta along with much of the South Asia became part of British India, the undivided tehsil (which includes what is now Kallar Syedan Tehsil) is described in the "Imperial Gazetteer of India" as follows:

The predominantly Muslim population of the area supported the Muslim League and Pakistan Movement. After the independence of Pakistan in 1947, the minority Hindus and Sikhs faced many attacks and massacres by the Muslims so they migrated to India.

Administration
The tehsil is administratively divided into 13 Union Councils, two of which form the city of Kahuta; these are:

Demography
The population of the Kahuta Tehsil is approximately 220,576 according to the
latest Complete census of Pakistan which was held in 2017.

Many Tribes are living in Kahuta like   Janjuas, Awans, Dhund, Jasgam Abbasis, Sudhans, Syeds, Sheikhs, Sattis, Gakkhars, Gujjars, Khattars, Qazis, Junhals, Mughals, Chauhans, Siddiquis, Dhanyal & many others.

See also
 Demography of Rawalpindi District

References

 
Tehsils of Rawalpindi District